Mário César Azevedo Alves Balbúrdia (born 19 August 1997) is an Angolan professional footballer who plays as midfielder for Portuguese club Estrela da Amadora and the Angola national team.

Professional career
Balbúrdia is a youth product of Primeiro de Agosto, and debuted with the senior team in 2018.

International career
Balbúrdia debuted with the Angola national team in a 1–0 2019 Africa Cup of Nations qualification win over Botswana on 9 September 2018.

References

External links
 
 

1997 births
Living people
Footballers from Luanda
Angolan footballers
Angola international footballers
Angola youth international footballers
Association football midfielders
C.D. Primeiro de Agosto players
C.F. Estrela da Amadora players
Girabola players
Liga Portugal 2 players
Angolan expatriate footballers
Expatriate footballers in Portugal
Angolan expatriate sportspeople in Portugal